Mark Patterson (born 13 September 1968 in Leeds) is an English former professional footballer. He played over 300 Football League matches for Carlisle United, Derby County, Plymouth Argyle and Gillingham between 1986 and 2002.

Playing career
Patterson began his career as a trainee with Carlisle United, turning professional in 1986, but after just 22 matches was signed by Derby County, then in the First Division for £60,000. He had to wait four years before making his first team debut, which came in November 1991 and, although he appeared to be on the verge of becoming a first-team regular, he was then sidelined by injury for several months and could not regain his place. In July 1993 he moved to Plymouth Argyle, who paid £85,000 for his services.

Patterson played over 130 Football League matches for Plymouth before being sold to Gillingham for £45,000 in October 1997. He made over 120 appearances for the Kent club but was forced to retire in 2002 due to injury.

Post-playing career
Patterson had a spell as assistant manager at Folkestone Invicta but left in 2006 to return to Gillingham as youth team manager. until March 2010. Patterson returned to the club as development coach, and subsequently assistant to manager  Steve Lovell, and became caretaker manager when Lovell was sacked shortly before the end of the 2018–19 season.

References

1968 births
Living people
Footballers from Leeds
Carlisle United F.C. players
Derby County F.C. players
Plymouth Argyle F.C. players
Gillingham F.C. players
Gillingham F.C. managers
English footballers
English Football League players
Association football defenders
English football managers